This is a list of state symbols for the US state of Ohio. The majority of these items are officially recognized by state law, having been ratified by an act of the Ohio General Assembly and executed by the governor's signature. These items can be found in the Ohio Revised Code, General Provisions, Chapter 5. Two of Ohio's official symbols have not been officially signed into law, but were made official through resolution in the Senate.

State motto
Adopted in 1959, the Ohio motto, With God, all things are possible, is a quotation taken from Matthew, 19:26. From 1865 until 1867, however, the motto was:  (Latin for "Empire within an Empire"). Too controversial for a post-Civil War society, it was repealed after two years.

State slogan

The current official marketing slogan (as of 2008) is:  Ohio—Birthplace of Aviation, in reference to Orville and Wilbur Wright, the inventing duo from Dayton who are credited with building the first successful airplane. A similar version of the slogan appears on Ohio's commemorative state quarter. In the case of the quarter, it reads: Birthplace of aviation pioneers. The addition of pioneers on the quarter's version, denotes space as well as air travel, as Ohio has been the birthplace of 24 NASA astronauts.

State symbols

State songs
Ohio's official songs include:

"Beautiful Ohio", by Ballard MacDonald (lyrics) and Robert A. King under the pen name Mary Earl (music), was adopted as the official state song in 1969. In 1989, the Ohio Legislature gave Wilbert B. McBride permission to update the lyrics.
		
"Hang on Sloopy", by Wes Farrell and Bert Russell, is the state's official rock song, adopted by the General Assembly in 1985.  The song's status was never signed into law, but rather was enacted through House Concurrent Resolution 16, 116th General Assembly, 1985–1986 Session.

Miscellaneous symbols

See also
List of Ohio-related topics
Lists of United States state insignia
State of Ohio

Citations & references
All listed codes (§) are from the General Provisions of the Ohio Revised Code unless otherwise stated. Retrieved in March 2008.

External links

State symbols
Ohio
Symbols of Ohio